The Cathedral of Saint Michael the Archangel, formerly known as Saint Ferdinand Cathedral is a cathedral located in the town of Gamu, in the province of Isabela, Philippines. Before it was built, the former seat of the Roman Catholic Diocese of Ilagan was located in San Fernando Church in Barangay  Bagumbayan, Ilagan City, Isabela.

Old Saint Ferdinand Cathedral

History
Ilagan had its beginnings as an encomienda of Don Hernandez de Paz circa 1617. The town was also founded as a mission of the Dominican priests called San Miguel de Bolo on April 21, 1619. After the local revolt in 1621 by the locals of Ilagan and nearby towns of Naguilian and Baculud, nothing has been written about the town’s history until it was re-found by Father Pedro Jimenez, O.P. in 1678. During that time, it was officially named as San Fernando de Ilagan. It was also formally accepted as a Dominican mission in March 1686.

Architectural history
Records tell that the construction of the church of Ilagan started at around 1696 to 1700. In 1777, Father Pedro de San Pedro, O.P. started the construction of the belfry. Later on, the tower was competed by Father Joaquin Sancho, O.P. in 1783, the date indicated in the clay inset found at the top of the tower. The church was recorded to have sustained heavy damages during a typhoon in 1866. It was torn down by the parish priest in the hopes of erecting a new structure. The current church structure is no longer the old stone structure erected in the Spanish-era. Only the tower remains intact.

New Gamu Cathedral
In 2003, the episcopal seat of the Roman Catholic Diocese of Ilagan was transferred from the Saint Ferdinand Parish Church to a new Church in Barangay Upi, in the town of Gamu. In 2013, Pope Francis decreed that the Cathedral be dedicated to Saint Michael the Archangel although the diocese remains under the patronage of Saint Ferdinand of Castile.

References

Roman Catholic churches in Isabela (province)
Roman Catholic cathedrals in the Philippines
Spanish Colonial architecture in the Philippines
Baroque architecture in the Philippines